Nigris is a surname of Italian origin, meaning black. Notable people with the surname include:
 Aldo de Nigris (born 1983), Mexican footballer
 Alfonso de Nigris (born 1976), known professionally as Poncho de Nigris, is a Mexican television host
 Antonio de Nigris (1978–2009), Mexican footballer
 Giuseppe De Nigris (1832–1903), Italian painter
 Julie Le Brun (née Julie Nigris; 1780–1819) daughter of Élisabeth Vigée Le Brun, and was the model of many of her paintings
 Leone Giovanni Battista Nigris (1884–1964), Italian prelate of the Catholic Church who worked in Albania, archbishop

See also 
Nigro
Negro